Kaalidas is a 2019 Indian Tamil-language action thriller film written and directed by Sri Senthil. The film stars Bharath and Ann Sheetal, while Suresh Menon and Aadhav Kannadasan portray other pivotal roles. The film began production during October 2017 and completed its shoot by March 2018. The film was released on 13 December 2019 and received generally positive reviews from the audience and critics and became a box office success. It is one of the best films of Bharath's career.

Plot

The film begins with the fall of a woman from the terrace of an apartment building. Then we are introduced to Inspector Kaalidas (Bharath), a good cop, who is shown convincing a man against killing himself. Kaalidas then proceeds to investigate the woman's death, which he presumes to be a suicide based on initial observations. Later, he visits residential apartments and tells them that they can reach out to cops for their issues. However, Kaalidas' extreme work pressure creates a strain on his relationship with his wife, Vidyaa (Ann Sheetal).

One day, a mysterious man (Aadhav Kannadasan) arrives at Kaalidas's house looking for a place to rent. After initially turning him down, Vidyaa leases out the first floor of their house to the man, who is revealed to be a disc jockey. Meanwhile, another woman dies after falling from her apartment terrace. The Deputy Commissioner of Police (Velraj) ropes in the experienced Assistant Commissioner of Police (ACP) (Suresh Menon) to assist in the investigation. Kaalidas suspects that the deceased women could be victims of the Blue Whale Challenge. However, the ACP suspects the events to be connected to murders.

Further investigations reveal that both victims had quite a few similarities. Both had fairly discontented married lives, and neither woman had any children. The respective apartment cameras were either not working or had been turned off during the incident. When the police restore the broken smartphone belonging to the second victim, they find a series of intimate exchanges between her and a guy called Aarav (Yukendran). Subsequent investigation of the death of the first victim also leads the police to conclude the existence of an extra-marital affair. However, the alibis of the captured men prove they were not at the scene of the crimes. Meanwhile, Vidyaa starts developing a close bond with her tenant, who resembles "Pappu", her college love.

The plot further thickens as a third woman falls to her death from her apartment terrace. The call history of the victim's mobile phone leads them to a guy, who reveals that the third victim made money by illegally renting her place out on nights for prostitution. A chain of leads directs the police towards a woman called Shanti, who is a procurer and is currently hospitalized. Upon learning the police are on her trail, Shanti successfully escapes from the hospital but is stabbed to death soon after. Meanwhile, the police find a common contact (David Susai, who runs a parlor) in the call histories of the first and third victims. Kaalidas learns from the parlor CCTV footage that the victims, along with his wife Vidyaa, were regular visitors to the parlor. Fearing that Vidyaa may be the murderer's next victim, Kaalidas frantically rushes home to warn her after she fails to respond to his calls.

Meanwhile, Vidyaa, who is celebrating her birthday at home with her tenant, is suddenly attacked by him. Just in the nick of time, the ACP arrives at Kaalidas' residence, and soon, Kaalidas too arrives on the scene. It is then revealed by the ACP that Vidyaa is the actual murderer and that the tenant was nothing more than a figment of her imagination.
Tracing the call history of the fourth victim led the ACP to Vidyaa's psychologist friend, who reveals that Kaalidas and Vidyaa's daughter had died two days after birth, as a result of which Vidyaa had become Schizophrenic. The lack of attention and care from Kaalidas pushes her into creating an imaginary version of the Kaalidas she loved during her college days - Pappu. The face of the imaginary character Pappu is also revealed to be stemmed from the ACP's son, who visits the same parlour Vidyaa goes to. Upon finding the man she met at the parlour has an element of resemblance to  her old Kaalidas, she takes on the character to be her tenant in her imagination. Hence, fearing that the women she meets in the parlor may divide her from her old Kaalidas, she empowers that imaginary Kaalidas to stop anything and anyone that attempts to separate her from her real Kaalidas - hence the murders of the women. The blood sample on the fourth victim's leg is found to match with Vidyaa's blood sample, which the ACP had collected from Vidyaa's psychologist, proving Vidyaa as the murderer.

The final scene where Vidyaa's imaginary character attempts to murder Vidyaa herself derives from the concept that Vidyaa wanted to be with her own Kaalidas, and not introduce another man in her life. Hence, when she finds herself to be cheating on her Kaalidas, it prompts her imaginary tenant to murder her. Upon closer inspection, it can also be found that Vidyaa, who was initially pursuing the tenant, freezes when he makes a move on her in her final birthday scene. This is done to highlight that Vidyaa freezes since she doesn't want to cheat on her husband with another man, the realisation that she is cheating then prompts the imaginary character to attempt to murder her.

Later, it is shown that Kaalidas has quit his job as a police officer to once again become the "Pappu" that Vidyaa loves. The film ends with Kaalidas singing Vidyaa's favorite Bharathiyar song and the imaginary Kaalidas vanishing into thin air.

Cast
Bharath as Inspector  Kaalidas / Pappu
Ann Sheetal as Vidyaa Kaalidas (Voice dubbed by Deepa Venkat)
Suresh Menon as ACP George
Aadhav Kannadasan as Vidyaa's tenant
R. T. Jayavel as Singadurai
Priyadarshini as Vidyaa's friend/psychologist
Ammu Ramachandran
Tiger Garden Thangadurai as Aarav
Velraj as DCP Velraj

Production 
The film was launched in October 2017, with production studios Leaping Horse Entertainment, Incredible Productions and Dina Studios announcing that they will jointly produce the directorial debut of Sri Senthil, who had earlier won the reality talent show "Naalaiya Iyakkunar". Titled Kaalidas, the team selected Bharath and Suresh Chandra Menon to portray pivotal roles in the film. Bharath was revealed to be portraying a police officer, with the film set in a span of three days.

The film completed its shoot across Chennai and Hyderabad, and was revealed to be in post-production by March 2018. Bharath began dubbing for his portions in the film after a month-long industry-wide strike on working on film was called off during April 2018.

Soundtrack
Soundtrack was composed by Vishal Chandrasekhar.
"Mazhai" - Sudha Raghunathan
"Santiago" - Andrea Jeremiah
"Meraki Nenjam" - Sharanya Gopinath
"Maalai Pozhudhin" - Abhay Jodhpurkar
"Kaakai Siraginile" - Abhay Jodhpurkar

Reception
Sify wrote, "Overall, Kaalidas is a smart investigation thriller that conveys an important message to this fast-moving society without being preachy." The Hindu wrote, "Kaalidas gets engaging by stitching these individual plots together, even though the proceedings leading up to the final showdown leave you confused — partly because none of these deaths or characters register." Times of India wrote "The movie has the required elements of a suspense thriller and the performance of lead artistes, too, elevate the decent script". Behindwoods wrote, "Kaalidas is a taut thriller with neat performances and an engrossing second half." Hindustan Times wrote "With some impressive writing and by avoiding stereotypes, the film stands out." Indian Express wrote "The rock-solid story gets diluted because of this convoluted part of the screenplay, and when the ultimate reveal is shown screen, you have either already guessed it or you are not invested enough to relish it."

References

2010s Tamil-language films
2019 action thriller films
Indian action thriller films
2019 films
Indian crime thriller films
2019 crime thriller films
2019 crime action films
Indian crime action films
Films scored by Vishal Chandrasekhar
2019 directorial debut films